Stigmatophora acerba is a moth in the family Erebidae. It was described by John Henry Leech in 1899. It is found in western China.

References

Moths described in 1899
Lithosiini
Moths of Asia